Makombo is a village in the territory of Niangara in the Haut-Uele province of Democratic Republic of the Congo. The village of Makombo received international media coverage because between 14 and 17 December 2009, the Makombo massacre took place. It was revealed by the Human Rights Watch report in March 2010.

References 

Populated places in Haut-Uélé